Sunes Summer is a Swedish comedy film which was released to cinemas in Sweden on 25 December 1993, directed by Stephan Apelgren. It is based on the chapter book with the same name, the eighth in the book series about Sune, written by Anders Jacobsson and Sören Olsson. At the 29th Guldbagge Awards, Peter Haber was nominated for the Best Actor award. It also won a shared first-prize during the Italiafiction festival in Salerno in July 1994.

Plot
It is summer in Sweden, and the Andersson family has decided to go on vacation to Greece. The trip turns out to be too expensive, especially when Håkan destroys a window in the travel agency after climbing a shelf of newspapers. Rudolf decides that they should go on a caravan holiday instead. When they start the journey, Karin runs over Rudolf's foot with the caravan and they have to go into a hospital. There, Rudolf  gets his foot bandaged by Lenny, a medic who is pretending to be a doctor. At the hospital Sune meets a girl named Cornelia and falls in love with her, but he makes a fool of himself at a candy vending machine by pressing the button for snus by accident.

The next day they arrive at the "Jonsson camp" where they should stay. At the campsite, Annas meet the greaser Leffe and they immediately become fond of each other, Leffe subsequently runs over Håkan with his quad bike. It turns out that the family is living next door to Lenny, and Cornelia his daughter.

Sune tries out a way to win Cornelia's heart, giving her a pair of earrings that he believes are in a toy machine at the camp site. Therefore, he begins to raise money by returning bottles and cans, but all he gets is a bunch of Phantom rings. Eventually he gets the earrings from one of the campsite owners.

Before it is time for the family to go home, they are invited to a farewell party by Lenny's family. During the party Lenny's brother Kenny, who is a real doctor, arrives. He looks at Rudolf's foot, which proves to be restored. The film ends with Sune and Cornelia meeting on the beach at dusk, where she gets the earrings.

Production
The film was shot in Stockholm, at Tofta Bech on Gotland and at Björkviks havsbad on Ingarö. Recordings began on 14 June 1993.

Cast
Peter Haber as Rudolf Andersson
Carina Lidbom as Karin Andersson
Andreas Hoffer as Sune Andersson
Gabriel Odenhammar as Håkan Andersson
Nina Almlöf as Anna Andersson
Pär Ericson as Rune/Torsten
Nils Moritz as the cyclist
Robert Gustafsson as Leffe
Lars Väringer as Lenny
Anna von Rosen-Sundelius as Bettan
Tina Johnson as Cornelia
Carl Magnus Dellow as Kenny
Gaby Stenberg as Mrs. Gunnarsson
Anne-Li Norberg as the lady at the travel agency
Göran Gillinger as the beachguy
Dorman Smith as a basketball player
My Linder as Stina

Home video
The film was released to home video 1994 in, originally to VHS and later also to DVD. It also appeared in the 2008 compilation box "Sommar & jul med Sune" consisting of a triple DVD also consisting of Sunes jul.

References

External links

1993 comedy films
Swedish comedy films
1990s Swedish-language films
Films based on Swedish novels
Films based on works by Anders Jacobsson and Sören Olsson
Films about vacationing
1993 films
Films directed by Stephan Apelgren
1990s Swedish films